The 50 Reichspfennig coin was minted by Nazi Germany between 1939 and 1944 during World War II. It is worth 1/2 or .50 of a Reichsmark. Made entirely of aluminum, the 50 Reichspfennig is an emergency issue type, similar to the zinc 1, 5, and 10 Reichspfennig coins from the same period.

Mint marks

Mintage

1939

1940

1941

1942

1943

1944

References

Modern obsolete currencies
Currencies of Europe
Currencies of Germany
Zinc and aluminum coins minted in Germany and occupied territories during World War II
Fifty-cent coins